The 2011 6 Hours of Zhuhai was a sports car racing event held at the Zhuhai International Circuit on November 13, 2011.  It was the seventh and final round of the 2011 Intercontinental Le Mans Cup.

Qualifying

Qualifying Result
Pole position winners in each class are marked in bold.

Race result
Class winners in bold. Cars failing to complete 70% of winner's distance marked as Not Classified (NC).

References

External links 
Intercontinental Le Mans Cup at Zhuhai, China - in pictures The Guardian. Retrieved on 1 December 2011.

Zhuhai
6 Hours of Zhuhai
2011 in Chinese motorsport